Neptis mayottensis is a butterfly in the family Nymphalidae. It is found on the Comoros.

References

Butterflies described in 1890
mayottensis
Endemic fauna of the Comoros